Ivan Maraš (Cyrillic: Иван Мараш; born April 20, 1986) is a Montenegrin professional basketball player for Okapi Aalst of the Belgian BNXT League.

Professional career
Maraš started playing basketball for Budućnost Podgorica of the Montenegrin League from 2003, until 2010. With Budućnost, he won three Montenegrin championships and three Montenegrin cups. Before the end of the 2009–10 season, he also signed with Metalac Valjevo.

Then, Maraš joined Hemofarm, signing a two-year contract with the club. On March 3, 2012, he left Hemofarm and joined the Belgian club Dexia Mons-Hainaut until the end of the season. At the end of the season, he renewed his contract with the club for another season.

In 2012, he signed a contract with the Cypriot team ETHA Engomis. During his season with the club, Maraš won the Cypriot Cup with ETHA and was also the MVP of the tournament. After his great performances with ETHA, Maraš joined Ilysiakos of the Greek Basket League for the rest of the season.

On September 5, 2013, Maraš signed a contract for the upcoming season with the Bahraini team Al Manama. With Al Manama, he won the Bahraini League. For the following two seasons, he played for Tsmoki-Minsk of the Belarus League. During his two-year spell with Tsmoki-Minsk, Maraš also played 3 games for Al Qadsia in Kuwait. With Tsmoki-Minsk, Maraš won two Belarusian championships and two Belarusian cups.

On October 6, 2016, he signed a one-year contract with the Iranian team Sanat Naft Abadan. On February 6, 2017, he signed with Doxa Lefkadas until the end of the season, replacing Melsahn Basabe on the team's squad. On April 20, 2017, he signed with Cholet of the LNB Pro A for the rest of the season. In August 2017, he re-signed with Cholet. On December 30, 2017, he parted ways with Cholet. On January 4, 2018, he signed with Greek club Aris Thessaloniki for the rest of the 2017–18 season.

He signed with Okapi Aalstar on July 4, 2019. He re-signed for two seasons on June 12, 2020. On August 11, 2021, Maraš extended his contract until 2023.

References

External links
 Ivan Maraš at euroleague.com
 Ivan Maraš at fiba.com

1986 births
Living people
ABA League players
Aris B.C. players
Basketball League of Serbia players
BC Tsmoki-Minsk players
Cholet Basket players
Doxa Lefkadas B.C. players
Ilysiakos B.C. players
KK Budućnost players
KK Hemofarm players
Okapi Aalstar players
KK Metalac Valjevo players
Montenegrin men's basketball players
Montenegrin expatriate basketball people in Serbia
Power forwards (basketball)
Sportspeople from Podgorica